Anton Bengtsson Lundqvist (born 16 September 1989) is a Swedish actor. He has played in several musicals such as Romeo & Julia and Blodsbröder. He has also presented a web-show for Allsång på Skansen. In 2015 he played the part of "Oscar" in the film En underbar jävla jul opposite his actress mother Maria Lundqvist.

Early life
Born in Gothenburg, Anton Lundqvist is the son of actors Mikael Bengtsson and Maria Lundqvist, and is the oldest of four children.

Career
Lundqvist plays the leading role of "Erik" in the 2005 film Kim Novak badade aldrig i Genesarets sjö. In 2010 he played the role of "Rolle" in the Swedish version of the musical Grease at the Göta Lejon theatre in Stockholm. He has also performed the role of "Gavroche" in the play Les Misérables Scandinavian Tour alongside singer Carola Häggkvist.

In 2011, Lundqvist played the part of "Mercutio" in the musical Romeo & Julia at Göta Lejon. In the summer of 2011 he presented the web-broadcast of the SVT sing-along show Allsång på Skansen. He did the presenting for one season in 2012; he was replaced by actor Robert Rydberg. In 2011 and 2012, he participated in the SVT show Gäster med gester. In December 2012 Lundqvist played the leading role in the play Peter Pan och Wendy at Stockholms Stadsteater. In 2013 he acted in the musical Blodsbröder along with actor Albin Flinkas. In 2014 he played the leading role in the film about Krakel Spektakel.

In 2015, Lundqvist played the part of "Oscar" in the film En underbar jävla jul, opposite his real-life mother, Maria Lundqvist. In the film he plays a homosexual man who invites his family for Christmas Eve celebration to tell them about him and his partner's planned surrogacy with their best friend.

Lundqvist is a friend of singer and Eurovision winner Måns Zelmerlöw.

Filmography
2005 – Kim Novak badade aldrig i Genesarets sjö
2011 – Arthur och julklappsrushen
2013 – Förtroligheten
2014 – Krakel Spektakel
2015 – I nöd eller lust
2015 – En underbar jävla jul
2015 – The Bridge

References

External links 

Living people
1989 births
21st-century Swedish male actors
Swedish male musical theatre actors
Swedish male film actors
Swedish male television actors
People from Gothenburg